Sir James Murray (19 September 1850 – 12 April 1933) was a Scottish Liberal Party politician.

He was elected unopposed as the Member of Parliament for East Aberdeenshire at a by-election in 1906, following the death of the Liberal MP James Annand, who had held the seat for only 16 days. He held the seat until the January 1910 general election, when he did not stand again.

He was knighted in 1915.

References

External links 
 

1850 births
1933 deaths
Scottish Liberal Party MPs
Members of the Parliament of the United Kingdom for Scottish constituencies
UK MPs 1906–1910
Knights Bachelor
Politicians awarded knighthoods